Avatharam is a 1995 Indian Tamil-language film written and directed by Nassar, making his directorial debut. The film stars him and Revathi. It was released on 9 June 1995, and won the Tamil Nadu State Film Award for Third Best Film.

Plot 

Kuppusamy, an innocent man, dreams to perform in Pandi's troupe, which performs in Hindu festivals. Baasi is expelled from the troupe for his bad behaviour. Finally, Pandi accepts Kuppusamy into his troupe. The blind girl Ponnamma, Pandi's daughter, falls in love with Kuppusamy. For some time, the festival's organisers prefer female dancers. Thereafter, Pandi dies during a stage performance, and the troupe splits up. Kuppusamy leaves the village with Ponnamma to become a film actor. There, they meet Baasi, and he accommodates them. Baasi then rapes and kills Ponnamma. Later, Kuppusamy is sent to a mental hospital, but he manages to escape. Kuppusamy is determined to take revenge on Baasi. Baasi, fearing for his life, seeks protection from the police in order to catch Kuppusamy. Kuppusamy first kills the policemen. A fight ensues between Kuppusamy and Baasi, in which Kuppusamy kills Baasi.

Cast 

Nassar as Kuppusamy
Revathi as Ponnamma
Bala Singh as Baasi
Srividya as an advocate
Delhi Ganesh as Pandi
Vennira Aadai Moorthy as Singaram
Sachu as Singaram's wife
Kaka Radhakrishnan
Junior Balaiah as Krishna
Murali Kumar as Pungavanam
Shanmugasundari as Marudhayi
Vincent Roy as a police officer
Thyagu

Production 
Avatharam marked the directorial debut of Nassar. To portray Therukoothu, he observed them for one year and completed writing the script within four months. Nassar revealed he was forced to include a revenge angle into the script for the sake of commercial viability.

Soundtrack 
The music was composed by Ilaiyaraaja. The song "Thendral Vanthu Theendumbothu" is set in Jaunpuri raga.

Release and reception 
Avatharam was released on 9 June 1995. Since no distributors were willing to take up this film due to lack of commercial elements, the film's producer had to distribute the film by himself throughout Tamil Nadu. K. N. Vijiyan of New Straits Times lauded the film, saying its only flaw was the cinematography: "Some scenes look blurry and dark". R. P. R. of Kalki praised Nassar's direction while also praising for portraying the life of Therukoothu artistes with authenticity and realism while also praising Ilaiyaraaja's songs and re-recording. However the film bombed at the box office. It won the Tamil Nadu State Film Award for Third Best Film.

References

External links 
 

1990s Tamil-language films
1995 directorial debut films
1995 films
Films about actors
Films about blind people in India
Films scored by Ilaiyaraaja
Indian films about revenge